The proposed flag of Vendsyssel in Denmark was introduced by the mayor of Hjørring in 1976, and is used to some extent.

The flag is named Vendelbrog (with reference to the Danish flag Dannebrog interpreted as The Danish cloth).

Design 
It is a Nordic Cross flag in blue, orange and green. The blue colour symbolizes the sea. The orange/red colour is symbol of the sun and the beaches of Vendsyssel, and the green is for the lush nature. By tradition, only people born in Vendsyssel can use the flag. 

The flag is not officially recognised, but it used to be a part of the insignia of the Royal Danish Air Force 723rd Air Squadron.

References 

Nordic Cross flags
Flags of Denmark
Unofficial flags